Matthias Nießner (born 1986) is a professor of computer science and entrepreneur from Germany, working in the fields of Computer Graphics and Computer Vision. He is an assistant professor of Computer Science at the Technical University of Munich. As a member of the Max Planck Center for Visual Computing and Communication Junior Research Group Program, he was a Visiting Assistant Professor at Stanford University, working in the lab of Pat Hanrahan.

Nießner was awarded a Google Faculty Research Award in 2017 for Photo-realistic Avatars from Videos:
Free Viewpoint Animation of Human Faces, as well as a Rudolf Mössbauer Fellowship from the Technical University of Munich.

Education and academic work
Nießner received a Ph.D. in computer graphics from the University of Erlangen-Nuremberg in 2013 and received his Diploma degree in 2010. His thesis on the topic of Subdivision Surface Rendering using Hardware Tessellation was submitted in 2013 and was awarded the highest honors. Some ideas from this thesis were used in the most recent version of Pixar's OpenSubdiv, which also incorporates ideas dating back to 1996 from Edwin Catmull, Tony DeRose, Michael Kass, Charles Loop, and Peter Schröder. Through a Junior Research Group Program, Nießner was a Visiting Assistant Professor from 2013 to 2017 at Stanford University in the lab of Pat Hanrahan. Since 2017 he has been an assistant professor at TUM, where he heads the Visual Computing Lab.

Nießner's work focuses on 3D reconstruction and semantic scene understanding. Among his best-known work is that on facial reenactment, which has been widely criticized for contributing to the ease with which fake news can be generated.  The majority of the external stake in his company Synthesia comes from speculative 2020 US Presidential candidate Mark Cuban.  He developed with his colleagues Face2Face, which was the first work to manipulate facial expressions from consumer cameras in real time. More recently, he has been working on 3D semantic scene understanding, developing with his colleagues ScanNet, the first large-scale, densely-annotated 3D dataset.

References

External links 
Matthias Nießner's Home Page
Matthias Nießner at DBLP Bibliography Server

German computer scientists
Living people
University of Erlangen-Nuremberg alumni
Academic staff of the Technical University of Munich
1986 births